Leptodactylus discodactylus (common name: Vanzolini's Amazon frog) is a species of frog in the family Leptodactylidae. It is found in the Amazonian Bolivia, Brazil (Amazonas and Acre states), Peru, Ecuador, and Colombia.

Description
Leptodactylus discodactylus is a medium-sized, moderately robust-bodied frog. Males measure  and females  in snout–vent length. The colouration is reddish brown, with paler flanks. The dorsum is smooth with some small tubercles. The fingers may or may not have disks, whereas the toes end in slightly expanded and rounded disks. The species shows local-scale variation in colour pattern, morphology, and advertisement call.

Habitat and conservation
Leptodactylus discodactylus is a reasonably common and generally widespread species active by day and night. It can be found on the forest floor and in swampy areas in the forest, seasonally flooded forests, and open areas. The eggs are laid close to water where the tadpoles develop.

Leptodactylus discodactylus is locally suffering from habitat loss.

References

discodactylus
Amphibians of Bolivia
Amphibians of Brazil
Amphibians of Colombia
Amphibians of Ecuador
Amphibians of Peru
Amphibians described in 1884
Taxa named by George Albert Boulenger
Taxonomy articles created by Polbot